Shoup is an unincorporated community in Lemhi County, Idaho, United States. Shoup has a population of 25. Shoup has a post office with ZIP code 83469, and a general store.

Shoup was named for George L. Shoup, first governor of Idaho.

See also

References

Unincorporated communities in Lemhi County, Idaho
Unincorporated communities in Idaho